Wagah railway station (Urdu and ) is located in Wagah, Punjab, Pakistan. It is the last station in Pakistan on the Lahore–Wagah Branch Line and serves as the border station before crossing into India. Wagah serves as a sub-urban station of Lahore and is also used for immigration and Customs of passengers who travel between India and Pakistan via Samjhauta Express.

See also
Koh-e-Taftan railway station
Atari railway station

References

External links

Railway stations in Lahore District
Railway stations on Lahore–Wagah Branch Line